Statistics of Veikkausliiga in the 2000 season.

Overview

It was contested by 12 teams, and Haka Valkeakoski won the championship.

League standings

Results
Each team plays three times against every other team, either twice at home and once away or once at home and twice away, for a total of 33 matches played each.

Matches 1–22

Matches 23–33

References
Finland - List of final tables (RSSSF)

Veikkausliiga seasons
Fin
Fin
1